"All I Wanna Do Is Dance" is a song written and recorded by New Zealand born, Australian pop singer Collette. It was released in July 1989 as the second single from her debut studio album, Raze the Roof (1989). The song peaked at number 12 on the ARIA Charts. In June 2019, an electro house remix was released in celebration of the song's 30th anniversary.

Track listing
7" (CBS 655047) 
Side A "All I Wanna Do Is Dance" - 3:29
Side B "Push" - 3:17

12"
Side A1 "All I Wanna Do Is Dance" (Land of the Giants Mix) - 5:47
Side A2 "All I Wanna Do Is Dance" (Stomp Mix) -  5:31
Side B1 "Push" (Stretch Mix) - 5:30
Side B2 "Push" (Revenge Mix) - 5:12

Charts

References

1989 songs
1989 singles
Songs written by Collette Roberts
CBS Records singles